Steinbach is a village and former municipality in the Wartburgkreis district of Thuringia, Germany. Since 31 December 2012, it is part of Bad Liebenstein.

References

Former municipalities in Thuringia